Eric the Pilot is the eighth live spoken word album from Henry Rollins, released May 5, 1999 on 2.13.61 Records. The CD contains a one-hour-long story about Henry trying to get to a show in Tulsa, Oklahoma. This story, along with the second disc of Think Tank, were recorded during the same Australian tour in October 1997.

Liner Notes
"Greetings. Some of you may remember this story from a few years ago. I found myself in Australia towards the end of 1997 and had not told this story . I let it rip one night and Randy had the tape rolling. I mixed this during the time I was editing material for Think Tank. I figured this was a cool way to release this story. Thanks for coming to the shows after all these years, I don't know where you get the strength."
-Henry Rollins, May 1999

Track listing
 "Eric the Pilot (Part 1)" - 11:05
 "Eric the Pilot (Part 2)" - 10:13
 "Eric the Pilot (Part 3)" - 8:27
 "Eric the Pilot (Part 4)" - 9:31
 "Eric the Pilot (Part 5)" - 6:01
 "Eric the Pilot (Part 6)" - 11:13

Credits
Randy Fransz - Recording
Blumpy - Mixing
Jeff Davis - Mastering

References

1999 live albums
Henry Rollins live albums
Live spoken word albums
Live comedy albums
Spoken word albums by American artists
2.13.61 live albums